Sillycook Mountain is a summit in the U.S. state of Georgia.

Sillycook is a name derived from the Cherokee language meaning "turtle", which was applied to this mountain on account of its shape.

References

Mountains of Habersham County, Georgia
Mountains of Georgia (U.S. state)